Stuart Polak, Baron Polak  (born 28 March 1961) is a British Conservative politician and life Peer in the House of Lords.

Early life
Stuart Polak was born in Liverpool, England. He attended the Childwall Hebrew Congregation, a synagogue in Liverpool, where he was a chazan, or cantor, on Jewish High Holidays. He took educational trips to Israel from the age of fifteen.

Career
Polak was a youth officer at the Edgware United Synagogue in Edgware, northwest London. He served as an officer of the Board of Deputies of British Jews in the 1980s.

Polak joined the Conservative Friends of Israel in 1989. He served as its Director for twenty-six years, until August 2015; he now serves as its honorary president. He also serves as chairman of TWC Associates and as a senior consultant to Jardine Lloyd Thompson.

Polak was appointed Commander of the Order of the British Empire (CBE) for political service in the 2015 New Year Honours. He was created a life peer taking the title Baron Polak, of Hertsmere in the County of Hertfordshire on 2 October 2015.

Resignation of Priti Patel
On 3 November 2017, the BBC's Diplomatic correspondent James Landale reported that Polak had accompanied Priti Patel, the Secretary of State for International Development when she had held a series of meetings in Israel in August 2017 without telling the Foreign and Commonwealth Office.  They met Yair Lapid, the leader of Israel's centrist Yesh Atid party, and visited several organisations where official departmental business was discussed. Those meetings, and others later, led to Patel's resignation from the Cabinet on 8 November 2017. In 2021, former Foreign Minister Sir Alan Duncan published his diaries, in which Polak featured as a frequent opponent of his fellow Conservative Duncan, allegedly operating in tandem with CFI colleague Eric Pickles to ensure the pro-Palestinian Duncan did not acquire certain governmental positions.

References

1961 births
Living people
Commanders of the Order of the British Empire
Conservative Party (UK) life peers
Life peers created by Elizabeth II
English Jews
Jewish British politicians
Politicians from Liverpool
People from Childwall
People educated at King David High School, Liverpool